The Troup-Harris Regional Library (THRL) is a public library system serving the counties of Troup, and Harris, Georgia, United States. The central library, LaGrange Memorial, is located in LaGrange, Georgia.

THRL is a member of PINES, a program of the Georgia Public Library Service that covers 53 library systems in 143 counties of Georgia. Any resident in a PINES supported library system has access to the system's collection of 10.6 million books. The library is also serviced by GALILEO, a program of the University System of Georgia which stands for "GeorgiA LIbrary LEarning Online". This program offers residents in supported libraries access to over 100 databases indexing thousands of periodicals and scholarly journals. It also boasts over 10,000 journal titles in full text.

History
The Troup-Harris Regional Library officially began in 2007 after neighboring Coweta County left the system in 2007 to begin their own.

In December 2016 the library system opened their first new building for the city of Hoganville. This library was the result of a $1.12 million SPLOST fund that was matched by $2 million from the state of Georgia. This new library has over 11,200 square feet of space for book stacks, meeting areas, and computers, and 
replaced the old 3,000 square foot building which was too small to house the branch's entire collection. Groundbreaking for a second library, to replace the current Harris County Library, began on March 21, 2017.

Branches

Library systems in neighboring counties
West Georgia Regional Library to the north
Coweta Public Library System to the north east
Pine Mountain Regional Library System to the east
Chattahoochee Valley Libraries to the south

References

External links
PINES catalog

County library systems in Georgia (U.S. state)
Public libraries in Georgia (U.S. state)